Win Zaw Oo (born 1977) is the tallest person in Burma, reaching  in height. He is also known as Big Zaw. Win Zaw Oo's growth has resulted from an uncommon medical condition known as acromegaly.

Life
Win Zaw Oo was born and raised in a rural village in Magway, central Burma. His family comprises working-class peasants. In his teens, his towering height became noticed following a growth spurt. He soon found it difficult to move about given his size and height and his stamina and mobility took a toll. He had to travel to Singapore due to the inferior healthcare system in Burma. The media became largely interested in him after learning of his predicament.

References

1977 births
Living people
People with acromegaly
People with gigantism
21st-century Burmese people
People from Magway Division